St Oswald's Church is a Grade I listed parish church in the Church of England in Askrigg, North Yorkshire.

History

The church dates largely from the 15th century, but there is some earlier work. It is of stone construction in the Perpendicular style, consisting of 5 bay chancel and nave, aisles, south porch and an embattled western tower with pinnacles containing a clock and six bells.

By the mid nineteenth century, the foundations of the nave piers had given way, so the church was restored between 1852 and 1854 at a cost of £1,500. The body and north aisle of the church were rebuilt. The roof of the nave which dated from the 15th century was repaired. A western gallery which blocked up the tower was removed, and a staircase giving better access to the tower was inserted. It reopened for worship by Charles Longley, Bishop of Ripon, on 31 October 1854.

Parish status
The church is in a joint parish with 
St Margaret's Church, Hawes
St Mary and St John's Church, Hardraw
St Matthew's Church, Stalling Busk

Bells

The bells were recast in 1897 by John Warner & Sons with the tenor weighing 10cwt, 1qtr and 25lb. Three original bells, said to date from c. 1657 were recast, and three new ones were obtained. The bells were rededicated on 11 November 1897 by John Pulleine, Bishop of Richmond. The bells were rehung in a new frame by Eayre and Smith in 1992.

Organ

The church has two manual pipe organ dating from 1869 by Forster and Andrews. A specification of the organ can be found on the National Pipe Organ Register.

References

Church of England church buildings in North Yorkshire
Grade I listed churches in North Yorkshire
St Oswald